FK Makedonija Gjorče Petrov, commonly referred to as FK Makedonija G.P. is a football club based in the municipality of Ǵorče Petrov, in Skopje, North Macedonia. They are currently playing in the Macedonian First League.

History
The club was founded in 1932 as HASK (Hanrievski amaterski sportski klub). During its history, the club was also known as Lokomotiva, Rudar, Industrijalec, and Jugokokta. The club received its current name in the 1989/90 season in commemoration of Gyorche Petrov, a revolutionary considered an important figure of the Internal Macedonian Revolutionary Organization.
 
Champions 1991 Makedonija had a great season , with 23 victories 9 losses and only 2 draws .Finishing on the top of the league table in front of traditionally great teams like: Rabotnichki , Belasica , SKOPJE , Tikvesh , Metalurg , KUMANOVO all previous Champions at the time and next season up-coming champion SASA . The title was won mainly because of the great games and victories at the home ground in Gjorche Petrov. That season Makedonija got up on the higher level and established the club as the league favorites. 

Makedonija entered the Macedonian First League when Macedonian Republic League transformed into First League in 1992. They were relegated in 1993/94 season. After playing one season in the Macedonian Second League they were back in the top division. In the 1997/98 season they finished third and qualified to play in the Intertoto Cup, where they played against NK Olimpija Ljubljana from Sloveniain the first round, and SC Bastia from France in the second. In the 2001/02 season they were relegated again, and played three seasons in the second division. Makedonija GP returned to the First League in the 2005/06 season with their best performance, finishing second.

 

 Cup Winners 2006  In the season 2005-06 FK Makedonija won the National Cup for the first time.In the final first round they had to face FK Ohrid at their famous Bilyana's Springs stadium.FK Makedonija managed to pull out an easy away win 0-3.In the Second round they've eliminated FK Napredok on aggregate  4-2,winning the home game 2-0 and drawing away 2-2. The Quarter-finals came and they faced FK Cementarnica winning both matches home and away 1-0 making it 2-0 n aggregate.In the Semi-finals they've faced FK Sileks ,drawing the first match at home 1-1 ,while winning the famous game away 2-1 and reaching their first final. 
The final game was held at the City Park National Arena. In a thriller match they won their first final by 3-2 with a goal in 92 second minute of stoppage time.The goal scorer was legendary  Filip Ivanovski.

They played in the qualifying rounds of the UEFA Cup 2006-07, where they lost to Bulgarian side Lokomotiv Sofia 3–1 on aggregate. 

Champions 2009 Makedonija had another great season and this time with even more difficult opponents such as: Vardar , Sileks , Pobeda , Pelister , Rabotnichki all numerous times Champions in the decades before. This time Makedonija played great winning both Home and Away games. This season Makedonija managed to reach the European Champions League qualifying stage . They've finished their Marvelous season on the top of the league table by Winning 17 games , 10 draws and only 3 defeats ,establishing the reputation of the big team in the domestic league championship.

After Makedonija GP quit the first league at the 2009–10 season, the club was unable to participate at any senior level; however, the club's board took over a third-tier club MFK Treska from the nearby village of Šiševo, moving the team to Makedonija's stadium, and became supported by the old Makedonija's fans. MFK Treska won the Macedonian Third League North promotion play-off in 2010–11, and had been playing in the Macedonian Second League in the 2011–12 season with ambitions to gain promotion to the top flight by sharing the top place on the table after the first round of the season.  The name change request was expected for some time now, and the Football Federation of Macedonia, on January 10, 2012, finally accepted the request by MFK Treska to change its name and become officially registered as FK Makedonija Ǵorče Petrov, name under which they will compete for the rest of the season.

 Cup Winners 2022-The Shoot Out Champions  In the season 2021-22 FK Makedonija won the National Cup.In the Final Round 1 they met FK Detonit and managed easy away Victory 0-3.In the Second round they draw away with Akademija Pandev 1-1 and the penalty roulette decided the match,ending 3-5 for FK Makedonija. They had the home ground advantage in the quarter finals eliminating the Champions.Regular time was a draw 0-0 and after the shoot out 4-1 for the hosts.In the Semi-Finals,they had to play away again . The match finished 0-0 ,and again they,ve beat the home side FK Struga after penalty roulette 2-4.
The final match was played at the City Park National Arena . It was a draw after the regular time again finishing 0-0 . FK Makedonija managed to beat FK Sileks in the final match after the shoot out this time 4-3 .

Honours

Domestic League

Champions
Winners (2): 1990-91.2008–09

Domestic Cup
Macedonian Football Cup
Winners (2): 2005-06, 2021–22

Recent seasons

1 In the 2010–11 and in the autumn part of 2011–12 season the club was competed under the name Treska.

2 The 2019–20 season was abandoned due to the COVID-19 pandemic in North Macedonia.

Makedonija GP in Europe
 Q = qualifier
 R1 = first round / R2 = second round

Players

Current squad
As of 2 February 2023.

Historical list of coaches

 Zoran Stratev (1991 – 1995)
 Kiril Dojčinovski (1999)
 Slobodan Goračinov (1999)
 Vujadin Stanojković (2000)
 Zoran Tanevski (2001)
 Baze Lazarevski (2001)
 Dobre Dimovski (2001)
 Ane Andovski (2002)
 Perica Gruevski (2005 – 9 Feb 2006)
 Radmilo Ivančević (10 Feb 2006 – 25 Aug 2007)
 Zoran Stratev (2007)
 Robert Stojanovski (26 Aug 2007 – 10 Nov 2007)
 Ilcho Gjorgioski (11 Nov 2007 – 2010)
 Ljupcho Matevski (2012)
 Vasko Bozhinovski (2012)
 Bobi Stojkoski (2012 – 2013)
 Borce Hristov (1 Jul 2013 – 5 Aug 2013)
 Gjorgji Todorovski (8 Aug 2013 – 3 Mar 2014)
 Marjan Sekulovski (4 Mar 2014 – 5 May 2014)
 Jovica Knežević (1 Jul 2015 – 30 Jun 2016)
 Bobi Stojkoski (8 Apr 2016 – 20 Aug 2016)
 Jovica Knežević (1 Jan 2016 – 15 Jun 2018)
 Aleksandar Tanevski (1 Jul 2018 – 11 Nov 2019)
 Naci Şensoy (20 Nov 2019 – 11 Mar 2020)
 Zikica Tasevski (12 Mar 2020 – 25 Apr 2021)
 Aleksandar Tanevski (26 Apr 2021 – 17 Oct 2021)
 Muharem Bajrami (17 Oct 2021 – )

References

External links
Official Website 
Supporters Website 
Club info at MacedonianFootball 
Football Federation of Macedonia 

 
Association football clubs established in 1932
Makedonija Gjorce Petrov
1932 establishments in Yugoslavia